Sundar Bou ( lovely wife) is a 1999 Bengali film directed by Sujit Guha.

Plot
Nanda's stepmother fixes his marriage with Sabitri. However, after marriage, Sabitri is exploited by the stepmother. When Sabitri's uncle learns about it, he decides to help her.

Cast
 Ranjit Mallick
 Tapas Paul
 Debashree Roy
 Lily Chakraborty
 Dilip Ray
 Mrinal Mukherjee
 Shubhendu Chattopadhyay
 Gracy singh ( Item dance )

Music
The film's music was composed by Anupam Dutta.

References

External links
 Sundar Bou at the Gomolo

1999 films
Bengali-language Indian films
1990s Bengali-language films
Films directed by Sujit Guha
Films scored by Anupam Dutta